John Preston Buchanan (January 30, 1888 – September 15, 1937) was an American politician who served as a member of the Virginia Senate, representing the state's 1st district.

Buchanan succeeded his father, Benjamin Franklin Buchanan, who would go on to become Lieutenant Governor of Virginia. After one term in office, he was defeated for reelection.

Early life and education
Buchanan was born in the town of Marion in Smyth County, Virginia on January 30, 1888. He was the first of seven children for Benjamin Franklin Buchanan, a politically active local attorney, and his wife, Eleanor Fairman Buchanan (née Sheffey).

After high school, Buchanan attended Washington and Lee University. He received his law degree from the University of Virginia.

Political career
A Democrat, Buchanan defeated Republican Robert A. Anderson in 1915 to serve as a senator during the 1916 General Assembly; the seat was occupied by his father in the previous session. His constituency was composed of Washington County, Smyth County, and the City of Bristol.

Personal life
Buchanan married Annabel Morris on August 14, 1912 in Salem, Virginia. The couple had four children, Eleanor, John, Jr., Annabel and Patrick.

References

External links
 
 

1888 births
1937 deaths
Democratic Party Virginia state senators
Washington and Lee University alumni
People from Marion, Virginia
20th-century American politicians